Bhalo Maye Kharap Maye is a 2019 Bengali drama film directed by Tamal Dasgupta. This film is based on a same name novel of Suchitra Bhattacharya and scheduled to be released on 13 September 2019 under the banner of Srijita Films and Entertainment. Although much talked about, the film failed to receive critical favour upon its release.

Plot
Ria Fernandez, a professional bar dancer lives in Park Circus, Kolkata with her unemployed alcoholic husband Shabby and their baby. One midnight while returning home, three customers of the bar forcefully pick up Ria and rape her. She fights for justice but loses the case in lower court. Samiran Sen, a renowned lawyer of Calcutta High Court takes up her case and Ria wins the battle. But the fact is that Samiran took the case with the intention to get the fame only not to give justice to a raped woman. Drunken Samiran confesses it to his wife Urmi. Urmi realises the nature of his husband and her position is nothing different with a bar dancer in the male dominated society. She decides to leave Samiran.

Cast
 Ananya Chatterjee as Ria Fernández
 Silajit Majumder as Shabby
 Joy Sengupta as Samiran Sen
 Sreelekha Mitra as Urmi Sen
 Arindam Sil

References

2019 films
Indian drama films
Films set in Kolkata
Films based on Indian novels
Films about women in India
Bengali-language Indian films
2010s Bengali-language films
2019 drama films
Films based on works by Suchitra Bhattacharya